is a Japanese manga series written and illustrated by Taku Sakamoto. It was first serialized in Shueisha's seinen manga magazine Miracle Jump in 2014, and was transferred to Weekly Young Jump, where it ran from 2015 to 2018, with its chapters collected in thirteen tankōbon volumes. An anime television series adaptation by Studio Hibari aired from June to September 2017.

Plot
A first-year student, Aoyama, is a genius soccer player who is also obsessed with cleanliness.

Characters

Fujimi High School

Soccer club

Aoyama is a first-year student and has competed in U16 matches before becoming a midfielder of the soccer club. He is a clean freak due to his mysophobia, which resulted in his unique style of playing soccer involving extremely cautious physical contact with other players and the ball. He also cleans the clubroom and soccer balls after school. He is popular among the students and often garners many spectators during club activities, causing Kaoru Zaizen to become annoyed. Aoyama chooses Fujimi High School for its "uniqueness", which turned out to be having bidets installed in its toilets.

Kaoru Zaizen is a rich kid who was the playmaker before Aoyama's arrival. He is the only person who could not get used to his eccentricities. While not good with his kick despite being a midfielder, Kaoru is good at using his head literally.

Moka Gotō is a student known for having a crush on Aoyama since elementary. She is good at lock picking and wields a baseball bat designed with nails and cute stickers as her weapon to protect him. After the soccer club members found out about her secretly cleaning their clubroom, Moka becomes their manager.

Kazuma Sakai is a no-nonsense defender with leadership qualities and good friends of Jin Tsukamoto and Taichi Yoshioka.

Jin Tsukamoto is a defender and is always seen wearing red-framed glasses. He cheers up the soccer club by playing a soccer ball with his butt. Jin reveals that he got bullied by his former soccer club captain named Ryō Kadomatsu because of his habit, which resulted in his fear of him.

Taichi Yoshioka is a gentle defender known for his love of eating and always seen together with Kazuma Sakai and Jin Tsukamoto.

Gaku Ishikawa is the soccer club captain and the only player with a girlfriend. He joins Aoyama's fan club since his girlfriend is a member.

Hikaru Tada is a narcissistic midfielder who viewed himself as a level above Aoyama.

Kiyoshi Satō is the wisecracking goalkeeper of the team.

Miwa Takei is the soccer club coach. She is good at judo but she chooses to join the soccer club because of her love for an anime with a soccer player as the main character. She is also a fan of yaoi.

Tsubasa Umeya is a judo club member who joined the soccer club after he fell in love with Moka Gotō. When he learned about her crush on Aoyama, Tsubasa decides to support Moka's love instead but he states that not every couple would end up marrying each other so he only needs to wait until his time comes.

Others

Atsumu Ozaki is a popular manga author under the pen name "Mirai Takada" known for his cool-handsome aura despite his secretive presence. He loves observing things around him for manga references but he later becomes annoyed with Aoyama's popularity. He decides to create an antagonist based on him but the character ends up gaining popularity for his manga instead.

Shion Narita is one of Aoyama's classmates and is also a clean freak like him but he hides it to avoid drawing attention. Shion likes to play online games, specifically "Beasts Hunter" because the online world is where he would not need to worry about getting dirty. He is playing at the same party as Aoyama in the game.

Mio Odagiri is the school's idol and a member of the basketball club. Despite her athletic ability, Mio is unable to shoot the ball until Aoyama inspires her to put some feeling into it. Mio is currently the only person who could touch Aoyama without him fainting. She is hinted to have developed a crush on him after her classmate pointed out their closeness.

Yuri Tamaru is Gaku Ishikawa's girlfriend and one of Aoyama's fans.

Oshigami-Minami High

Oshigami-Minami High's forward who always insists on Aoyama joining their soccer club instead while looking down on the rest of Fujimi High's soccer club members. He always shows his abs when talking to Aoyama.

One of the U16 players' along with Aoyama, whose football skills exceeds those of Aoyama's. He was contracted with a Spanish football club, but he came back to Japan because he missed Japanese food.

Seigo's girlfriend whom he thought was bad at cooking, but in reality, she cooks healthy for Seigo's sake. Although it makes her food taste bland.

Takada High

Kana is Yōji's girlfriend who was initially tasked to lock Aoyama up in their clubroom to ensure Takada High's win but ended up becoming his fan instead.

Takada High soccer club's captain with a Yankee hairstyle. It is said that soccer is the only thing he does seriously but, he likes to playing dirty to ensure his win.

Media

Manga
Clean Freak! Aoyama kun is written and illustrated by Taku Sakamoto. It was first published in Shueisha's Miracle Jump on May 20, 2014. It was later transferred to Shueisha's Weekly Young Jump on January 29, 2015, and finished on January 4, 2018. Shueisha collected its 113 chapters into thirteen tankōbon volumes, released between June 19, 2015 and March 19, 2018.

Volume list

Anime
An anime television series adaptation by Studio Hibari aired from July 2 to September 17, 2017. With Kazuya Ichikawa directing and Midori Gotou supervising scripts. TMS Entertainment are credited with producing the anime. The opening theme is "White" by Bentham, while Ryotaro Okiayu, Tomokazu Seki, Sōichirō Hoshi, Daisuke Sakaguchi, Hiroyuki Yoshino perform the ending theme "Taiyō ga Kureta Kisetsu" (The Season the Sun Gave Us) under the name "Fujimi High School Soccer Team." Crunchyroll streamed the anime.

Episode list

Notes

References

External links
 
 

2017 anime television series debuts
Anime series based on manga
Association football in anime and manga
Comedy anime and manga
Medialink
Seinen manga
Shueisha manga
Studio Hibari
Tokyo MX original programming
Yomiuri Telecasting Corporation original programming